The 2017 Hertfordshire County Council election took place on 4 May 2017 as part of the 2017 local elections in the United Kingdom. All 78 councillors were elected from electoral divisions which returned one county councillor each by first-past-the-post voting for a four-year term of office.

Boundary changes to the electoral divisions took effect at this election after a review of the county by the Local Government Boundary Commission for England increasing the number of seats on the council from 77 to 78.

Election results

Results by electoral division

Broxbourne (6 Seats)

Dacorum (10 Seats)

East Herts (10 Seats)

Hertsmere (7 seats)

North Herts (9 seats)

St Albans (10 seats)

Stevenage (6 seats)

Three Rivers (6 seats)

Watford (6 seats)

Welwyn Hatfield (8 seats)

Changes before 2021

References

2017
2017 English local elections
2010s in Hertfordshire